Adult Care could refer to:
 Residential care for adults
 Adult daycare center
 Elderly care
 The Child and Adult Care Food Program in the United States

See also
 Wartburg Adult Care Community